Listen Up Philip is a 2014 comedy-drama film written and directed by Alex Ross Perry. The film had its world premiere at 2014 Sundance Film Festival on January 20, 2014, and won the Special Jury Prize at the 2014 Locarno International Film Festival.

Plot
Philip (Jason Schwartzman) is an acclaimed but abrasive young writer waiting for the publication of his second novel. He feels bored of his daily life and his shaky relationship with photographer girlfriend Ashley (Elisabeth Moss). In all of this chaos, his idol, veteran novelist Ike Zimmerman (Jonathan Pryce), offers him accommodation at his summer home, an isolated place where he might find peace.

Cast
 Jason Schwartzman as Philip Lewis Friedman 
 Elisabeth Moss as Ashley Kane
 Krysten Ritter as Melanie Zimmerman
 Joséphine de La Baume as Yvette
 Jonathan Pryce as Ike Zimmerman
 Eric Bogosian as Narrator 
 Jess Weixler as Holly
 Flo Ankah as Brandy
 Brandy Burre as Flo
 Daniel London as Seth
 Dree Hemingway as Emily
 Kate Lyn Sheil as Nancy

Reception
Listen Up Philip received positive reviews from critics. Rotten Tomatoes gives the film 85% based on 122 critics, with an average rating of 7.58/10. The site's critics consensus reads: "As thought provoking as it is uncompromising, Listen Up Philip finds writer-director Alex Ross Perry taking a creative step forward while hearkening back to classic neurotic comedies of (19)70s cinema". On Metacritic, it has an average score of 76% based on reviews from 34 critics, indicating "generally favorable reviews".

Scott Foundas of Variety, in his review said that "Jason Schwartzman shines as a self-absorbed writer who doesn't quite learn the error of his ways in Alex Ross Perry's sharp and darkly funny third feature." Todd McCarthy in his review for The Hollywood Reporter praised the film by saying that "[An] indisputably talented work for its risk-taking, dark humor and barbed portraiture of creative individuals." Richard Brody of The New Yorker, praised the film by saying that "I can't think of a recent movie that stages with as much joy and wonder the sense of living a life that becomes, directly or obliquely, in action or in idea, the stuff of art." Sam Fragoso in his review for RogerEbert.com said that "Alex Ross Perry's third feature film is his most narratively satisfying and intellectually demanding one, demonstrating a maturation in both style and substance." Rodrigo Perez of Indiewire, graded the film A- and said that "A deeply misanthropic portrait of narcissism, the brittle nature of artistic talent and the struggles of living in New York City, this toxic comedy pulls very few punches when it needs to get really nasty."

The A.V. Clubs Ignatiy Vishnevetsky called it "a howlingly funny black comedy with really sharp teeth", going on to say: "Writing pithy wisecracks is easy. What Perry does is write banter that reveals his character's insecurities and weaknesses; [...] There's a level of criticism at play in the film, which immediately sets it apart from similarly set New York art-world horror stories, but it doesn't cancel out the writer-director's clear empathy for his characters, who never quite manage to empathize with each other. This sort of mature perspective is a rare thing, and Listen Up Philip establishes Perry as a major talent."

References

External links
 
 
 
 

2014 films
2014 comedy-drama films
2014 independent films
American comedy-drama films
American independent films
English-language Greek films
Films about writers
Films directed by Alex Ross Perry
Films scored by Keegan DeWitt
Films set in New York City
Films shot in New York City
Greek comedy-drama films
Films with screenplays by Alex Ross Perry
Films shot in 16 mm film
2010s English-language films
2010s American films